Elizabeth Mary Ettorre (born 28 June 1948) is an Anglo-American feminist sociologist.

Career 
Ettorre completed a Bachelor of Arts degree in Sociology at Fordham University, New York, before earning a Ph.D. in the subject with a thesis  'The Sociology of lesbianism: female "deviance" and female sexuality' at the London School of Economics and Political Science. She attended the UK's first National Lesbian Conference in Bristol in 1974 and helped to organise the UK's ninth national Women's liberation movement conference in London in 1977. Ettorre did sociological research at Institute of Psychiatry, Birkbeck College and Charing Cross and Westminster Medical School all of the University of London in the 1970s – 1980s; became Professor of Sociology at University of Plymouth and as of 2011 is Emeritus Professor of Sociology, University of Liverpool and Honorary Professor, Aarhus University, Denmark. Since the mid-1990s, Ettorre has been a Docent in Sociology at Åbo Akademi University and University of Helsinki. Aside from lesbianism and feminism, her academic interests include women and substance use, reproduction and genetics and autoethnography.

Personal life 
Since 1990, Ettorre has lived in Helsinki, Finland with her wife, Irmeli Laitinen, a Finnish feminist psychotherapist and group analyst.

Selected publications 

Autoethnography as feminist method: sensitizing the feminist ‘I’(London: Routledge, 2017)  .
 (with E. Annandale, V.M. Hildebrand, A. Porroche-Escudero and B. Katz Rothman) Health, Culture & Society: Conceptual legacies and contemporary applications (Basingstoke: Palgrave Macmillan, 2017) .
 (with Nancy Campbell) Gendering addiction: the politics of drug treatment in a neurochemical world (Basingstoke: Palgrave Macmillan, 2017) .
 (2010) “Nuns, dykes, drugs and gendered bodies: An autoethnography of a lesbian feminist’s journey through ‘good time’ sociology”, Sexualities,13, 3: 295–315, .
Revisioning Women and Drug use: Gender, Power and the Body (Basingstoke: Palgrave Macmillan, 2007) .
 (Editor) Making Lesbians visible in the Substance Use Field (New York: The Haworth Press, 2005) .
 (2000) Exploring Lesbian Archetypes or Reviving 'drooping wings' Journal of Lesbian Studies,  4, 1: 127-143 .
Reproductive genetics, gender and the body (London, Routledge, 2002) .
Women and Alcohol: From a private pleasure to a public problem? (London: Women's Press, 1997) .
 (with E. Riska) Gendered Moods: Psychotropics and Society. (London: Routledge, 1995) 
Women and Substance Use (London, Macmillan, 1992) .
 (1985) 'Compulsory heterosexuality and psycho-trophy' Women's Studies International Forum, 8, 421–428, .
Lesbians, Women and Society (London: Routledge and Kegan Paul, 1980) .
 (1980) 'Sappho revisited: a new look at lesbianism', Women's Studies International Quarterly, 3, 415–442. 
 (1978) 'Women, urban social movements and the lesbian ghetto', International Journal of Urban and Regional Research, 2, 499-520  
 In The Wiley Blackwell Encyclopedia of Social Theory, Ettorre has provided the definition for the word, “lesbianism”.

References 

American women sociologists
American sociologists
Academics of the University of Plymouth
Lesbian academics
Alumni of the London School of Economics
Academics of the University of Liverpool
British LGBT writers
American LGBT writers
American emigrants to England
American emigrants to Finland
1948 births
Living people
21st-century LGBT people